Amari Cooper (born June 17, 1994) is an American football wide receiver for the Cleveland Browns of the National Football League (NFL). He played college football at Alabama, where he was the Biletnikoff Award winner as the nation's top receiver and a unanimous All-American in 2014. Widely considered the top wide receiver prospect of the 2015 NFL Draft, Cooper was selected with the fourth overall pick by the Oakland Raiders.

After successful rookie and sophomore seasons that included back-to-back 1,000-yard campaigns and two Pro Bowl appearances, Cooper struggled in his third season with the Raiders, totaling just 680 yards. Midway through the 2018 season, he was traded to the Dallas Cowboys and his play began to flourish again, including a 217-yard performance, and as a result, was voted to the third Pro Bowl of his career. Cooper also had successive 1,000 yard seasons in 2019 and 2020, making the Pro Bowl in 2019.

Early years
Cooper attended Miami Northwestern Senior High School in Miami, Florida. As a junior, he missed much of the season with an injury, but still managed to be one of quarterback Teddy Bridgewater's primary targets and had 16 catches for 175 yards with four scores. Cooper was dominant on the 7-on-7 circuit at various college campuses before his senior season. He had a show-out performance at Alabama's summer camp, and that quickly led to an offer from Nick Saban and the Crimson Tide. In his final year, he hauled in 33 receptions for 722 yards and six touchdowns. He was a first-team FHSAA 8A All-State selection, as well as the number-four player on Orlando Sentinels Florida Top 100. He was also invited to play at the 2012 Under Armour All-America Game, where he had a 75-yard touchdown grab and a 93-yard punt return for a score. In addition to being a standout in football, Cooper also starred in basketball and track at Miami Northwestern.

Cooper was a consensus four-star prospect. He was listed as the number 45 in the Rivals100, and was considered the number-six wide receiver and number-eight player in Florida by Rivals.com. ESPNU listed him as the nation's number-seven wideout and number-46 overall prospect in the ESPNU 150 while ranking 25th in the ESPNU Southeast Top 100 and number 12 in Florida. He was ranked as the number-six wide receiver and the number-10 player in the state of Florida by 247Sports.com, while ranking him 55th in the Top247. Also, Scout.com rated him as the number-12 pass catcher in the nation and 86th overall prospect. He chose Alabama over Florida State, Miami, and Ohio State, among others. Cooper announced his verbal commitment to the University of Alabama on September 22, 2011.

College career

Freshman season
As a freshman at Alabama, Cooper played in all 14 games, including starts in the final nine games. He led the team with 59 receptions for 1,000 yards and 11 touchdowns. The 11 touchdowns broke Alabama's 62-year-old record by Al Lary. His receptions and receiving yards broke Julio Jones's Alabama freshman records. In the SEC Championship, he had eight receptions for 128 yards and a touchdown in the 32–28 victory over Georgia, including the go-ahead touchdown with 3 minutes left in the game. In Alabama's 2013 BCS National Championship Game 42–14 victory over Notre Dame, Cooper led all Alabama receivers with six catches for 105 yards and two touchdowns. Cooper earned consensus Freshman All-American honors and was selected to the SEC All-Freshman team by the league coaches.

Sophomore season
As a sophomore in 2013, Cooper played in 12 games with seven starts, missing two games due to injury. He had 45 receptions for a team-high 736 yards and four touchdowns. He had his best game of the season against Auburn in the Iron Bowl, recording six receptions for 178 yards, including a school record 99-yard touchdown reception from quarterback A. J. McCarron. In the Sugar Bowl against Oklahoma, he had nine receptions for 121 yards in the 45–31 loss.

Junior season
As a junior in 2014, Cooper set numerous single-season and career records for Alabama. Against Tennessee, he broke Alabama's single game receiving yards record, finishing with 224. He later matched the record against Auburn. For the season, Cooper had 124 receptions for 1,727 yards and 16 touchdowns, both school records. In addition, his 124 receptions were an SEC record. He became Alabama's all-time leader in receptions (228), receiving yards (3,463), and receiving touchdowns (31). Cooper was a finalist for the Heisman Trophy, finishing third behind Marcus Mariota and Melvin Gordon. He won the Biletnikoff Award that season and was also named a unanimous All-American.

After his junior season, Cooper entered the 2015 NFL Draft.

College statistics

Professional career
Cooper was considered one of the best wide receivers in the 2015 draft class, together with Kevin White. In most mock drafts, he was projected to be a top-10 pick, with some having him as high as the fourth pick in the 2015 NFL Draft.

Oakland Raiders

2015 season: Rookie year
The Oakland Raiders selected Cooper in the first round with the fourth overall pick in the 2015 NFL Draft.
Cooper was initially assigned the jersey number 19, but following the release of fellow receiver James Jones, he switched to number 89. Cooper made his NFL debut on September 13, 2015. He had five receptions for 47 yards in a 33–13 loss to the Cincinnati Bengals. In his second game against the Baltimore Ravens, he had 109 yards and caught his first touchdown on a 68-yard pass from Derek Carr. The following week, Cooper had a franchise rookie record eight receptions for 134 yards in a 27–20 road victory over the Cleveland Browns, becoming the first Raiders receiver with consecutive 100+ yard receiving games since Randy Moss in 2005. Through three games, his 290 receiving yards were third in NFL history. On November 8, 2015, Cooper passed Tim Brown's record for rookie receptions (43) in a 35–38 loss to the Pittsburgh Steelers.

On December 20, 2015, Cooper became the first rookie in franchise history to reach the 1,000-yard mark and the only receiver in the club to reach that same mark since Randy Moss, in 2005. His 72 receptions are also franchise rookie records. On December 22, 2015, Cooper was selected as an alternate for the Pro Bowl, alongside teammates Derek Carr and Latavius Murray; he replaced Brandon Marshall and played. He was named to the NFL All-Rookie Team for 2015.

2016 season
Cooper put together a solid second season in the NFL. In the season opener against the New Orleans Saints, he had six receptions for 137 yards in a 35–34 road victory. During Week 5 against the San Diego Chargers, he had six receptions for 138 yards and a touchdown in a 34–31 victory. Three weeks later against the Tampa Bay Buccaneers, he had his best game of the season with 12 receptions for 173 yards and a touchdown in a 30–24 overtime road victory. Overall, he had 83 receptions for 1,153 yards and five touchdowns. Cooper was named to his second consecutive Pro Bowl on December 20, 2016. He was also ranked 53rd by his peers on the NFL Top 100 Players of 2017.

2017 season

In the season opener against the Tennessee Titans, Cooper had only five receptions for 62 yards on 13 targets, though one was a touchdown. After having 33 yards in Week 2, Cooper had three consecutive games with less than 10 receiving yards. However, on Thursday Night Football, in a 31–30 victory over the Kansas City Chiefs in Week 7, Cooper caught 11 passes for a then career-high 210 yards and two touchdowns. His yardage was the most by any NFL player at that point in the 2017 season, the second-most in franchise history, and the first 200+ yard game in franchise history since 1965. With his stellar performance in Week 7, Cooper earned AFC Offensive Player of the Week. In the season finale against the Los Angeles Chargers, Cooper caught three receptions for 115 yards and an 87-yard touchdown in the 30–10 loss. He was later revealed to have struggled throughout the latter half of the season with an ankle injury that hampered his play. Cooper finished the 2017 season recording career-lows with 48 receptions for 680 yards but did have a career-high seven touchdowns.

2018 season
On April 22, 2018, the Raiders exercised the fifth-year option on Cooper's contract.

During Week 4 against the Cleveland Browns, Cooper caught eight passes for 128 yards and a touchdown in a 45–42 overtime win. Two weeks later against the Seattle Seahawks in London, Cooper suffered a concussion and was knocked unconscious. The Raiders went on to lose 27–3.

Dallas Cowboys

2018 season
On October 22, 2018, Cooper was traded to the Dallas Cowboys in exchange for a first-round pick (27th overall, Johnathan Abram) in the 2019 NFL Draft.

In his first game with the Cowboys on November 5, Cooper led the team with five receptions for 58 yards and a touchdown as the Cowboys lost to the Tennessee Titans by a score of 28–14. On Thanksgiving Day, Cooper had eight receptions for 180 yards and two touchdowns, including a 90-yard touchdown catch in the third quarter as the Cowboys defeated the Washington Redskins by a score of 31–23. He was named the NFC Offensive Player of the Week for his performance. Two weeks later against the Philadelphia Eagles, Cooper had 10 catches for a career-high 217 yards and three touchdowns. His final touchdown, in overtime, came off a deflection from Rasul Douglas as the Cowboys won 29–23. His 217 receiving yards were the most by one player for a single game in the 2018 season. For his performance, Cooper earned his second NFC Offensive Player of the Week award. He earned his third career Pro Bowl nomination.

The Cowboys finished atop the NFC East with a 10–6 record and were the number-four seed for the NFC playoffs. In the Wild Card Round victory over the Seattle Seahawks, Cooper had seven receptions for 106 yards. In the Divisional Round against the Los Angeles Rams, he had six receptions for 65 yards and a touchdown in the 30-22 road loss. On January 21, 2019, Cooper was added to the NFC Pro Bowl roster as an injury replacement for New Orleans Saints wide receiver Michael Thomas. In 15 games on the Raiders and Cowboys rosters during the 2018 season, Cooper accumulated 75 receptions, 1,005 yards, and seven touchdown receptions. He was ranked 64th by his fellow players on the NFL Top 100 Players of 2019.

2019 season

On July 1, 2019, Cooper stated, "I think the change of scenery was really necessary, I really, honestly, don't think if I would've stayed with the Raiders last season that I would've been able to flourish and reach some heights that I was able to reach as a Cowboy. So, it was definitely necessary."

During the season opener against the New York Giants, Cooper caught six passes for 106 yards and a touchdown as the Cowboys won by a score of 35–17. During Week 5, Cooper caught 11 passes for a career-high 226 yards and a touchdown as the Cowboys lost to the Green Bay Packers by a score of 34–24. During Week 10 against the Minnesota Vikings, he caught 11 passes for 147 yards and a touchdown as the Cowboys lost by a score of 28–24. During Week 14 against the Chicago Bears on Thursday Night Football, Cooper caught six passes for 83 yards and a touchdown in the 31–24 road loss. During the game, he reached 1,000 receiving yards on the season. He was named to his fourth career Pro Bowl for his performance in 2019.

Cooper finished the 2019 season with 79 receptions for a career-high 1,189 yards and eight touchdowns in 16 games and starts. He was ranked 49th by his fellow players on the NFL Top 100 Players of 2020.

2020 season
On March 17, 2020, Cooper signed a five-year contract extension with the Cowboys worth $100 million, which featured $60 million guaranteed, $40 million at signing, and a $20 million injury designation that becomes fully guaranteed in 2022.

The 2020 season saw Cooper reach at least 100 receiving yards in four games. Despite having four quarterbacks start over the season due to injuries, Cooper finished the 2020 season with a career-high 92 receptions for 1,114 yards and five touchdowns in 16 games and 15 starts.

2021 season
In the regular season opener, Cooper recorded 13 receptions for 139 yards and two touchdowns in a 31–29 road loss to the Tampa Bay Buccaneers. His 13 receptions set a new mark for the most by a Cowboys player in a season-opening game. During a Week 8 20-16 road victory over the Minnesota Vikings, Cooper caught eight passes for 122 yards and the game-winning touchdown. Cooper missed Weeks 11 and 12 after testing positive for COVID-19.

Cooper finished the 2021 regular season with 68 receptions for 865 yards and a career-high eight touchdowns (tied for the team lead) in 15 games and 14 starts. In the Wild Card Round against the San Francisco 49ers, Cooper had six receptions for 64 yards and a touchdown in the 23–17 loss.

On January 14, 2022, Cooper was fined $14,650 by the NFL after he attended a Dallas Mavericks game without wearing a face mask, a violation of COVID-19 protocols.

Cleveland Browns
On March 16, 2022, Cooper was traded to the Cleveland Browns in exchange for a fifth-round pick and a swap of sixth-round picks in the 2022 NFL Draft.

NFL career statistics

Regular season

Postseason

Records and achievements

Raiders franchise records

 First rookie to record 1,000 receiving yards
 Most receiving yards in a season by a rookie: 1,070

Personal life 
Cooper is an avid chess player. He was first captivated by the game as an elementary school student in northwest Miami, and as a football player, he relates chess strategies to his play on the field. He played in Chess.com's BlitzChamps, a rapid tournament for NFL players, and came in second place behind Chidobe Awuzie.

See also
 List of NCAA major college football yearly receiving leaders

References

External links

 
 Cleveland Browns bio
 Alabama Crimson Tide bio
 ESPN.com bio

1994 births
Living people
African-American players of American football
American Conference Pro Bowl players
American football wide receivers
Alabama Crimson Tide football players
All-American college football players
Oakland Raiders players
Dallas Cowboys players
Cleveland Browns players
National Conference Pro Bowl players
Players of American football from Miami
Miami Northwestern Senior High School alumni
Unconferenced Pro Bowl players
21st-century African-American sportspeople